Catocala koreana is a moth in the family Erebidae first described by Staudinger in 1892. It is found in Japan, Korea and south-eastern Siberia.

References

koreana
Moths described in 1892
Moths of Asia